The Goddess of Spring is a 9-minute Silly Symphonies animated Disney short film. The Symphony is imbued with operatic themes and is often cited as melodramatic. It was released in 1934, and its production was important to the future development of Disney's Snow White and the Seven Dwarfs animation. Each Silly Symphony was a technological marvel at the time and proceeded to further advancements in the animation industry.

While the plot of The Goddess of Spring follows the Greek myth of Persephone (known as “Proserpina” in Roman Mythology) and Hades (Pluto), the imagery is more evocative of Hell and Satan (or, more specifically, a traditional stage Mephistopheles).

Plot
There once was a time in the long, long, ago, when there was joy and laughter everywhere, when the flowers that grew, blossomed all the year through, and the world was eternally fair. For there lived a maiden, so gentle was she, that all the world loved her tenderly, and life was then so pleasant, that joy was ever present, and the world grew more lovely each day. The flowers danced around her, they formed a wreath and crowned her, the Goddess of Eternal Spring, the Goddess of Eternal Spring.

Proserpina, the Roman Goddess of Spring, lives in a beautiful garden of eternal spring. She is greeted by dancing flowers and elves who stand by her throne and defend her when Pluto, the God of the Underworld, comes to take her away. He plans to make her his queen in the Underworld, where she is crowned by Pluto and welcomed by a choir of imps. Meanwhile, above ground, the creatures suffer a rough winter and mourn the absence of their goddess.

In the Underworld, the Goddess of Spring weeps. Pluto shows concern for her unhappiness, and offers anything to make her happy; they reach the agreement that she will spend six months above ground and six below, resulting in the four seasons. She is allowed to return to her world, thawing the snow and ending the winter.

Importance of production
When The Goddess of Spring was produced, it was an important stepping stone in the advancement of animation. The development of the human characters in The Goddess of Spring, specifically, would lead to the eventual animation of Snow White and the Seven Dwarfs. While Disney's animating staff was well-versed in the animation of animals, their experience in designing humans was severely underdeveloped. The Goddess of Spring was among the first string of short films in which they used human characters. It provided much-needed experience for the upcoming major motion picture that Disney was designing.

According to film historians, the animation skill level between The Goddess of Spring and Snow White and the Seven Dwarfs appears to have a twenty-year gap between the two; comparatively, it was only three years. The development in that span of time was monumental and is reflected in the major motion picture. Although feature-length cartoons were initially disregarded, the animation advancements attributed to The Goddess of Spring, as they were displayed in Snow White and the Seven Dwarfs, brought the feature film to top the list as highest-grossing sound film at the time.

There are some negative reviews about certain aspects of The Goddess of Spring - such as the goddess' "rubber arms" and the melodrama of the Silly Symphony overall. Its operatic tendencies and over-dramatization, while criticized, are also points of admiration from viewers. It is also noted that the usage of shadows, especially in the "underworld" scenes, are phenomenal additions to the sequence.

List of animators
The animators on staff for Disney's The Goddess of Spring were vital to the advancement of animation, as The Goddess of Spring was produced as "practice" for Snow White and the Seven Dwarfs. Several animators who worked on the short film later worked on the major motion picture.

Cy Young
Hamilton Luske
Leonard Sebring
Clyde Geronimi
Les Clark
Dick Huemer
Art Babbitt
Ugo D'Orsi
Wolfgang Reitherman
Frenchy de Tremaudan
Louie Schmitt

List of other staff
Director Wilfred Jackson
Story creator Bill Cottrell
Music coordinator Leigh Harline
Voice actor Kenny Baker (singing narrator)
Voice actor Tudor Williams (Pluto)
Voice actress Jessica Dragonette (Proserpina)
Character designer Albert Hurter

Home media
Disney released several collections of Silly Symphonies short films on VHS, DVD and Laserdisc. In the United States, The Goddess of Spring appeared on the VHS tape Cartoon Classics : First Series : Volume 13 : Fanciful Fables.

It was also featured on the DVD versions of It's a Small World of Fun - Volume 4, Snow White and the Seven Dwarfs Platinum Edition, Walt Disney Treasures: More Silly Symphonies, Volume Two. and Walt Disney Animation Collection : Volume 4 : The Tortoise and the Hare.

In Japan, The Goddess of Spring appeared on Laserdisc on More Silly Symphonies, Donald Duck's 50 Crazy Years, Goin' Quackers, and Scary Tales. In Germany, France and Italy, the short film was released on VHS on Verrückte Musikanten, Silly Symphonies Volume 1, and Silly Symphonies Volume 2, respectively.

References

Sources
 "The Goddess of Spring (Disney, 1934)." (1934) - The Internet Animation Database. The IAD, n.d. Web. 01 Feb. 2017.
"The Serious History of Silly Symphonies." Oh My Disney. Insider, 20 May 2016. Web. 01 Feb. 2017.
Davis, Amy M., & Eastleigh, U.K. : Bloomington, IN: John Libbey Pub. ; Distributed in North America by Indiana University Press (2006). Good Girls and Wicked Witches: Women in Disney's Feature Animation.
"Silly Symphonies." Silly Symphonies - The Encyclopedia of Disney Animated Shorts. N.p., n.d. Web. 01 Feb. 2017.
"The Goddess of Spring." Disney Wiki. N.p., n.d. Web. 01 Feb. 2017.

External links

 
 

1934 films
1934 short films
1930s color films
1930s Disney animated short films
Animated films based on classical mythology
Films directed by Wilfred Jackson
Films produced by Walt Disney
Silly Symphonies
1934 animated films
Films scored by Leigh Harline
Proserpina
1930s American films